Aacocrinus is a genus of extinct sea lily from the Actinocrinitidae (or Patelliocrinidae)  family. It has been shown that it was an attached stationary organism that blindly fed on passing organism. It was composed of Mg calcite and its habitat included the upper-level epifauna.

There are currently 14 species within this genus:

 Aacocrinus acylus (Webster & Jell 1999)
 Aacocrinus algeriaensis (Webster, Maples, Sevastopulo, Frest & Waters 2004)
 Aacocrinus boonensis 
 Aacocrinus chouteauensis
 Aacocrinus enigmaticus (Webster & Lane 1987)
 Aacocrinus milleri
 Aacocrinus nododorsatus (Bowsher 1955)
 Aacocrinus protuberoarmatus (Missouri)
 Aacocrinus sampsoni
 Aacocrinus senectus
 Aacocrinus spinosulus
 Aacocrinus spinulosus
 Aacocrinus tetradactylus (Missouri)
 Aacocrinus triarmatus

References

Monobathrida
Paleozoic echinoderms
Prehistoric echinoderms of North America